Jennifer Irwin (born June 17, 1975) is a Canadian actress best known for her roles as Dolly Durkins on iZombie and as Laurie Neustadt in the comedy Superstore.

Irwin is a graduate of McGill University in Montreal, Quebec. She worked with The Second City in the mid-1990s, and starred in the HBO series Eastbound & Down. She played Carol in Kerri Kenney-Silver's Dame Delilah web series.

Filmography

Film

Television

Awards and nominations
At the 6th Annual Canadian Comedy Awards (2005) she was nominated for Pretty Funny Female. She was nominated for a Gemini Award for her performance Slings and Arrows. In 2010, the Canadian Comedy Awards nominated her for Best Performance by a Female in TV for Less Than Kind. At the 1st Canadian Screen Awards in 2013 Irwin was nominated for Best Performance by an Actress in a Continuing Leading Comedic Role for her performance in Michael: Tuesdays and Thursdays, episode "Heights".

References

External links
 

Living people
Actresses from Toronto
Canadian film actresses
Canadian sketch comedians
Canadian television actresses
Comedians from Toronto
McGill University alumni
20th-century Canadian actresses
21st-century Canadian actresses
Canadian women comedians
21st-century Canadian comedians
Year of birth missing (living people)